Mystère is the second album from French psychedelic rock group La Femme, released on 2 September 2016.

Track listing

Charts

References

La Femme albums
2016 albums